Trenton Dam is a dam on the Republican River in Nebraska, standing in Hitchcock County in the southwestern part of the state.  The facility stands about 2 and one-half miles west of Trenton, Nebraska.

The dam is a project of the United States Bureau of Reclamation and was built between 1949 and 1953 for irrigation water storage and flood control.  At 144 feet high, the dam's length is 8600 feet at its crest.

Lake Swanson is the reservoir formed by the dam, with a capacity of 246,291 acre-feet.  It is popular for recreational fishing, boating, camping, hunting and hiking, with 4974 acres of water surface, 5253 land acres, and about 30 miles of shoreline.

References 

Dams in Nebraska
Reservoirs in Nebraska
United States Bureau of Reclamation dams
Buildings and structures in Hitchcock County, Nebraska
Embankment dams
Dams completed in 1953
Bodies of water of Hitchcock County, Nebraska